Paddle to the Sea (French: Vogue-à-la-mer) is a 1966 National Film Board of Canada short live-action film directed, shot and edited by Bill Mason. It is based on the 1941 children's book Paddle-to-the-Sea by American author and illustrator Holling C. Holling, and follows the adventures of a child's hand-carved toy Indian in a canoe as it makes its way from Lake Superior to the Gulf of Saint Lawrence, through Canada's waterways. It was nominated for an Academy Award for Best Live Action Short Film at the 40th Academy Awards.

Production 
While the story begins near Lake Nipigon, the launch scene was shot in Gatineau Park. Other shooting locations included a staged forest fire at Meech Lake, with Mason torching spruce trees that he had installed along the shoreline, and the local fire department on standby. Mason and colleague Blake James did not ask for permission to climb over the safety fence to film the sequence of the little boat going over the Horseshoe Falls: they rappeled down to the water's edge, with James casting the boat into the water and Mason filming. The filmmaker taught himself to carve in order to make the boats, which had to be replaced when they drifted off at sea—or were lost over Niagara Falls.

Differences from book 
The film differs from the children's book in its inclusion of the problem of water pollution. While Holling's 1941 book focuses only on the geography and commercial importance of the Great Lakes and Saint Lawrence River, Mason's film includes a sequence where the tiny boat must endure polluted waters, shot on Lake Superior near Marathon, Ontario.

Awards

 Yorkton Film Festival, Yorkton, Saskatchewan: First Place, Creative Arts and Experimental Films, 1967
 Salerno Film Festival, Salerno, Italy: First Prize, Information Films, 1967
 American Film and Video Festival, New York: Blue Ribbon, Stories for Children, 1967
 International Educational Film Festival, Tehran, Iran: Golden Delfan, First Prize, Educational Films for Children, 1967
 La Plata International Children's Film Festival, La Plata: Silver Plaque, 1968
 Film Critics and Journalists Association of Ceylon, Colombo, Sri Lanka: Certificate of Merit, 1969
 International Festival of Short Films, Philadelphia: Award for Exceptional Merit, 1971
 Educational Film Library Association of America, New York - Sightlines Magazine list of 10 Best Films of the Last Ten Years, 1968
 International Film & Television Festival of New York: Silver Medal, Education, Language Arts, 1987
 40th Academy Awards, Los Angeles: Nominee: Best Live Action Short Film, 1968

Post-release notes
To attend the Academy Awards in Los Angeles, Mason drove down from Canada with a canoe on his car roof, stopping at rivers along the way. Today, the Canadian Museum of History has one of Mason's hand-carved canoe replicas; his family has several more.

Season 1, Episode 1 (The Loop) of Tales from the Loop television series has the characters watching Paddle to the Sea at 30:15.

References

Works cited

External links 
 Watch Paddle to the Sea at NFB.ca
 
 
 

National Film Board of Canada short films
1966 films
Films directed by Bill Mason
Films based on children's books
Canoeing films
Canadian drama short films
Environmental films
Canadian children's adventure films
Films about toys
Great Lakes
Saint Lawrence River
Films scored by Louis Applebaum
1960s English-language films
1960s Canadian films